Katarina Luketić (born 28 September 1998) is a Croatian volleyball player. She plays as opposite spiker for Croatian club HAOK Mladost.

International career 
She is a member of the Croatia women's national volleyball team. She competed at the 2017 FIVB Volleyball World Grand Prix, and 2021 Women's European Volleyball League.

References

External links
Katarina Luketić at CEV.eu

1998 births
Living people
Croatian women's volleyball players
Sportspeople from Zagreb
Expatriate volleyball players in Italy
21st-century Croatian women